Penny football (also coin football, sporting coin, table football, tabletop football, or shove ha'penny football) is a coin game played upon a table top. The aim of the game is for a player to score more goals with the pennies ("Spucks") than their opponent.
An electronic version of the game has also been produced.
The game has been in existence since at least 1959.

Gameplay 
Players flip a coin to decide who goes first. The winner of the flip starts the game by holding three coins clasped together in their hands, shaking the coins like dice, then letting them go.

The object of the game is to flick a coin through the other two coins. This is the way in which players move the ball up the table. If the coin falls off the table or fails to pass through the other two coins, it becomes the opposing player's ball and is placed near their end of the table. A player may continue to flick any of the three coins through the other two until they wish to shoot. At this point, the opposing player places their pinky finger and index finger flat on the table, so that the middle two knuckles of their hand are flat with the table edge. The first player then shoots in any way they wish, while still hitting a coin between the other two coins. If the coin touches the opponent's knuckles, this counts as a goal.

There is another variation of the game in which players use four coins, the fourth coin representing a goalkeeper. Again, the opposing player puts out their index and pinky fingers, but also puts the fourth coin under their index finger. The coin acts as a "goalkeeper", and may be used to block shots. They then stick out the pinky finger of their other hand and place it right next to the other hand to form the other post of the goal. The two hands should be touching. If the player blocks the shot with their index finger, the shot counts as a goal.

See also
 Button football
 Coin rugby
 Paper football
 Shove ha'penny
 Tabletop football

References

Coin games
Disk-flicking games